Pavle Petrović also variously spelled Pavel Petrovits, Paul Petrovits, Paulus Petrovitz, Paulus Petrovits and Pablo Petrovits (Serbian: Павел Петровић: Timișoara, Habsburg monarchy, now part of Romania, 1818 - Rome, Kingdom of Italy, 14 June 1887) was a Serbian painter. He can be considered among the first 19th-century European-trained painters who decided to make a living by traveling for forty-year across all continents, leaving portraits behind him that capture the best of European Romanticism of the time. His works can be found in museums and private collections in Serbia, Romania, England, India, China, the United States of America, Hawaii, Chile, Peru, Canada, Australia, Egypt, and Italy.

While travelling to Australia in April 1881, Petrović’s second wife, Elizabeth, suddenly took her own life. Police chief Frederick Standish investigated suicide and found no foul play, though that incident didn't stop the sensational press from spreading slanderous rumours overseas that would haunt Petrović's reputation for years to come, eventually contributing to his marginalization altogether.

In the beginning, Petrović was not well-known in his country of origin until Serbian art historian Miodrag Marković began in 2015 researching his life and work.

Early life and education
He was born Pavle Petrović in 1818 in Timișoara, the capital city of today's Romanian Banat, which was at that time a part of the Austrian Empire, though the area where he was born was under Hungarian administrative rule (hence he was also mentioned as a Hungarian, Austrian, Romanian and even Polish national in some obscure sources). His father Sava Petrović (1788-1861), an accomplished painter, seeing in his son a predilection in painting, made sure that he got the best academic training in art. Sava and his wife Maria Sibeslov came originally from a nearby village of Izvin and settled in 1814 in Timișoara's suburb Fabrika, where the majority of the population was Serbian at the time. They had three sons, Nikola, Vladimir and Pavle, the youngest and the only one who took up his father's profession.

When he was quite young, he served as his father's apprentice. There he learned drawing, painting, shading, colour, and the art of actually mixing paints from several natural pigments and minerals.

After graduating from a gymnasium in Timișoara, Sava sent Pavel to Vienna where he enrolled at the famed Academy of Fine Arts. His professor was Leopold Kupelwieser, a follower of Romantic Nazarene movement. He attended the academy at about the same time as his compatriot artists Dimitrije Avramović and Anastas Jovanović. Upon returning to his hometown, Petrović received numerous painting commissions, mostly portraits, icons, and iconostasis. Later, he decided to make a living as a globe-trotting, travelling painter.

Petrović also travelled throughout the United States, living and working in New York, Cincinnati, Chicago, and later, resumed his travels over several years to Honolulu, Calcutta, the Malaysian state of Johor, Bangkok, Cairo, and Rome where he died in 1887.

Further reading
Павел Петровић - заборављени српски сликар : од Темишвара до Хаваја by Марковић, Миодраг, 1962

See also
 List of Serbian painters

References 

1818 births
1887 deaths
Artists from Timișoara
Realist painters
19th-century Serbian painters
Serbian male painters
Romantic painters
19th-century Serbian male artists